Vietnam is a 1987 Australian TV mini-series directed by Chris Noonan and John Duigan. It stars Barry Otto, Nicole Kidman and Nicholas Eadie. The series won the Logie Award for Most Popular Single Telemovie or Miniseries.

Plot
Set in the 1960s through to the early 1970s, Vietnam is a mini-series about Australia's involvement in the Vietnam war. The Goddard family live in Canberra – Public servant Douglas, Evelyn (Veronica Lang) and their son Phil and daughter Megan. Aged 15, Megan is now a rebellious teenager, infuriating her conservative parents whilst her older sibling Phil is a budding photographer.

Australia joins the war in Vietnam and the strains and stresses it places on the Goddard family mirror the political and social upheavals the country experiences in the 1960s. Phil is called up in the national draft and he reluctantly goes to do his duty with Australian army forces in Vietnam. He encounters the harsh realities of the war when the platoon walks into a minefield in a rice paddy, losing several men including Phil's friend Ritchie.  Phil is horrified as his unit is ordered to assist South Vietnamese forces to forcibly evacuate and destroy a peasant village. Phil and his best mate Laurie become romantically involved with Vietnamese sisters Lien and Le. Back home, Douglas' workaholic lifestyle is straining his marriage and both parents are growing distant from their increasingly headstrong daughter Megan. The latter begins a relationship with an older boy Serge and she has to, at first, pretend to be a fellow university student to become involved with him. Serge goes away to University in Sydney and Megan later runs away from home to join him. Phil comes home on leave but the traumatic experiences of the war weigh heavily on him and he can no-longer adjust to normal life.

Phil and Laurie return to the war which is growing ever more bloodier and cruel. Le is gang-raped by a platoon of US soldiers who have been brutalized by their experiences of combat. One American soldier is left behind to execute Le but he cannot bring himself to do it, instead he cuts off one of her ears and fires a shot into the dirt, in order to convince his comrades that he had killed her and taken a 'souvenir'. Outraged by the sufferings of her people, Lien joins the Viet Cong. During the Tet Offensive, her group ambushes an Australian truck, wiping out the occupants including Laurie who is left permanently disabled by his injuries. Phil, increasingly disillusioned with the conduct of the war, joins a unit that specializes in unconventional warfare. After taking part in an ambush of a group of guerrillas Phil is horrified to discover that one of the dead is Lien. Unbalanced by his discovery he later endangers his fellow soldiers with a grenade during target practice and is thrown out of the unit as a result.

Back in Australia, the Goddard family begins to be torn apart. Douglas has become a key figure in the political decisions behind Australia's involvement in the war and he serves under all four prime-ministers who hold office during the Vietnam era, the demands of his job absorbing all of his time and energy. Fed up with the lack of attention from her husband and the unfulfilling existence as a housewife, Evelyn moves to Sydney. Megan goes to live with Serge and both become heavily involved with the antiwar movement. Evelyn later joins the movement, feeling happier in her newfound independence and she and Megan become close again. Serge is called up by the draft but he conscientiously objects, going to prison for his stance.

Phil returns to Australia for good, as does Laurie who is joined by Le who emigrates to become the latter's wife, doing her best to care for her disabled and traumatized husband. Phil grows more isolated, not even seeing his family and he becomes self-centered and bitter. He cannot understand nor accept the anti-war movement and free-wheeling youth culture he sees around him.

Megan has become a leading figure in the anti-war protests and whilst answering questions on a talk-back radio show, her confidence and self-righteous composure is shattered by a surprise call from Phil whose voice she recognizes. Phil's resentment and bitterness makes Megan regret her movement's lack of support for returning soldiers. Le tells Phil about her rape and torture and why her sister joined the Viet Cong and he finally breaks down in tears, Le's story putting his own sufferings into perspective, jolting him out of his isolation.  Douglas, Evelyn and Megan have a reunion dinner and afterwards as they are saying goodbye to each other outside, Megan notices some-one watching them from a nearby parked Holden ute. It is Phil. He says 'It's me.....sort of.'

The series concludes with Megan greeting Serge as he is released from prison and the two walk away arm-in-arm to face their future and adulthood together.

Cast
 Barry Otto as Douglas Goddard
 Nicole Kidman as Megan Goddard
 Nicholas Eadie as Phil Goddard
 Veronica Lang as Evelyn Goddard
 John Polson as Serge
 Mark Lee as Laurie Fellows
 Pauline Chan as Lien
Grace Parr as Le
 Alyssa-Jane Cook as Deb
 John Allen as T.V journalist
 Brett Climo as Ritchie
Mick Conway as Knifethrower
Celia De Burgh as Monica Montgomery
 Virginia Hey as Journalist
 Jim Holt as Lt Smart
 Cassandra Delaney as Melissa
 John Castelo as extra at BBQ
 Noel Ferrier as Prime Minister Robert Menzies
 Henri Szeps as Prime Minister Harold Holt
 Alan Cassell as Prime Minister John Gorton
 Kevin Manser as Prime Minister William McMahon
 Leo 'Lucky' Grills as Senator Shane Paltridge
 John Tarrant as Elphick (radio operator)

Production
The project was filmed in New South Wales, Australia, and for the month of June 1986 the Vietnam scenes were filmed in Phuket in Thailand. Kidman was 19 years old at the time, and Kennedy-Miller, the producers of the series, would later cast her in Dead Calm.

Vietnam features a host of high caliber Australian television actors. Veronica Lang, Barry Otto and Nicholas Eadie (aged 27 at the time) comprised the Goddard family, playing Megan's mother Evelyn, father Douglas and older brother Phil, respectively. Otto is a five-time nominated Australian Film Institute actor, who built up a solid body of work since his debut in the mid-1970s. Playing Evelyn is Veronica Lang, an English actress who was a familiar face on TV screens in England and Australia from 1965. She starred in Winners alongside Kidman in 1985, playing Alison Trig. Both Barry Otto and Veronica Lang also starred in Aussie soap A Country Practice, in which Kidman also appeared. Playing the pivotal role of Phil, Megan's older brother who gets drafted into the army, is Nicholas Eadie.

Reception
The first episode of Vietnam was broadcast in Australia on 23 February 1987, and received some positive reviews from the Australian press. Reviews praised the show's accuracy in portraying society's changing attitudes towards the war, as well as the family dynamic and character development. "There is much to admire and little to criticize in Vietnam. Personal relationships inside and outside the family and the shift in society's attitudes have been penetratingly and evocatively observed. All the characters, including the South Vietnamese for once, have been given an empathetic point of view," wrote The Age on the day of the show's premiere. The paper added that, "The direction elicits absolutely involving performances from a top-drawer cast who endow the piece with subtle flourishes and delightful finishing touches." In another review a few days later, the paper added – "Especially fine are Nicholas Eadie as Phil, beginning as a finely crafted ordinary bloke and ending as a man who has experienced too much, and Nicole Kidman as the little sister who grows up. It is their relationship, brother and sister, which holds the whole thing together."

Awards

TV Week Logie Awards, 1988:
Most Popular Single Telemovie or Miniseries: Vietnam (Ten)
Most Popular Actor in a Single Drama or Mini-Series: Nicholas Eadie (Vietnam)
Most Popular Actress in a Single Drama or Mini-Series: Nicole Kidman (Vietnam)

Australian Film Institute Awards, 1987:
 Best Performance by an Actor in a Mini Series: Nicholas Eadie (Vietnam)
 Best Performance by an Actress in a Mini Series: Nicole Kidman (Vietnam)

Releases
Original broadcast: Channel 10, 23 February 1987 – 27 April 1987. Vietnam aired in the UK in 1988.

Home video
2009 Australia – PAL/Region 4 DVD
Multi-region PAL/NTSC DVD (USA/Canada: Languages: English (Dolby Digital 2.0)
Multi-region PAL/NTSC DVD English (Dolby Digital 5.1), English (Subtitles)
Widescreen (1.78:1) 3 DVD

See also
 Cinema of Australia

References

Nicole Kidman Official Website
NKidman Specials

External links
Vietnam (TV mini-series 1987) IMDB
Mini-series 1987
(1987) Vietnam (TV miniseries) Night Master
IMP Awards
Vietnam at Australian Screen Online

1987 Australian television series debuts
1980s Australian television miniseries
Television series set in the 1960s
Television series set in the 1970s
1987 Australian television series endings
Films produced by Doug Mitchell
Films directed by Chris Noonan
Television series about Vietnam War